Alysson oppositus is a species of wasp in the family Crabronidae. It is found in North America.

References

Crabronidae
Articles created by Qbugbot
Insects described in 1837